Pierre Veyron (1 October 1903 – 2 November 1970) was a French Grand Prix motor racing driver active from 1933 through 1953.

Career
Pierre Veyron enrolled at university to study engineering. Veyron's friend, Albert Divo, convinced Veyron to take up racing and introduced Veyron to André Vagniez, an industrialist who provided financial support to Veyron. Vagniez purchased a Bugatti Type 37A that Veyron drove to his first racing victory, winning the 1930 Geneva Grand Prix.

Jean Bugatti, son of Bugatti founder Ettore Bugatti, hired Pierre Veyron in 1932 as a test driver and development engineer. Veyron entered races as a Bugatti company driver, winning many including the 1933 and 1934 Berlin Avus races while driving a Bugatti Type 51A. Veyron's most significant race victory was his 1939 win at the 24 Hours of Le Mans, co-driving a Bugatti Type 57S Tank with Jean-Pierre Wimille.

During World War II, Veyron joined the French Resistance against German occupation. For his service during the war, the Republic of France awarded him the Legion of Honour in 1945.

After the war, Veyron continued racing, but his main focus was on his family and his oil-drilling technology company. Veyron died in Èze, France in 1970.

Bugatti Automobiles S.A.S. named the Veyron 16.4 supercar in honor of Veyron.

Racing record

Complete 24 Hours of Le Mans results

References

1903 births
1970 deaths
Bugatti people
French racing drivers
24 Hours of Le Mans drivers
24 Hours of Le Mans winning drivers
World Sportscar Championship drivers